Michael Clark (born 5 September 1997) is an English professional footballer who plays for St Albans City, as a defender.

Career
Clark captained the Leyton Orient youth team during the 2015–16 campaign, winning the South East and West Youth Merit League.

In his first season as a pro, Clark was sent on loan to East Thurrock United at the start of the 2016–17 season, making 35 appearances in all competitions and scoring four goals. This included the second in the 2–0 win over Colchester United in their Essex Senior Cup quarter-final on 4 January 2017.

Clark was recalled from his loan and drafted into the Leyton Orient first team squad in February 2017, and made his debut as a second-half substitute for Tom Parkes in the 1–0 league defeat at home to Cheltenham Town on 25 February 2017.

A second loan spell at East Thurrock was announced on 15 December 2017, initially to run for one month.

On 29 June 2018, Clark agreed to join newly-promoted National League side Braintree Town.

Career statistics

References

1997 births
Living people
Association football defenders
Leyton Orient F.C. players
East Thurrock United F.C. players
Braintree Town F.C. players
Concord Rangers F.C. players
St Albans City F.C. players
English footballers
English Football League players
National League (English football) players